Manuel Quezada (born October 13, 1977) is an American professional boxer and former kickboxer. In boxing he fights at heavyweight, while in kickboxing he fought at both heavyweight and super heavyweight.

Amateur Kickboxing Career

Quezada won the IKF Amateur International Rules United States Amateur Heavyweight Title on March 14, 1998 in Bakersfield, California when he defeated Jason Williamson by first-round KO. Six months later, he became the IKF Amateur International Rules California Super Heavyweight Champion on September 12, 1998 in Bakersfield when he defeated Carter Williams of Modesto, CA by TKO.

On April 24, 1999, Friant, CA, USA, he was defeated by Carter Williams of Modesto, CA, by "Inhalant Disqualification" when it was discovered by the California Athletic Commission Rep, Dean Lohuis, that Carter's trainer had ammonia on his wipe rag during the first round break. Quezada was leading on all 3 judges cards after a first round knockdown of Williams, 10–8.

The title was retired/stripped by the IKF when Quezada demanded to be paid to defend on an event promoted by Abe Belardo in Bakersfield in June 2001. His challenger was Carter Williams, the same fighter he defeated to win the title 3 years earlier. This time though Williams was 40+ lbs bigger.

Quezada's last kickboxing bout was on December 11, 1999 and ended with an Amateur Kickboxing record of 8–3 with 4 wins by KO/TKO.

Quezada won the IKF West Coast Super Heavyweight Title on February 20, 1999 in Bakersfield, California when he defeated Dewey Cooper of Las Vegas by a unanimous decision 48–47, 49–46 and 49–46 
Quezada turned Pro as a boxer in August 2001 which vacated his Amateur title.

Boxing career
In September 2007 he won the WBC CABOFE (Caribbean Boxing Federation) heavyweight title.

Quezada was set to compete in an eight-man 95 kg/209 lb "Road to Glory" kickboxing tournament, a qualifier for the Glory promotion, in Tulsa, Oklahoma on February 1, 2013. However, he pulled out and was replaced by Dustin Jacoby who went on to win the tournament.

He lost to Tony Lopez via unanimous decision in the semi-finals of a four-man tournament at WCK Muay Thai: Beauty and the Beast in Lemoore, California on May 1, 2014.

Professional record

|- style="margin:0.5em auto; font-size:95%;"
|align="center" colspan=8|29 Wins (18 knockouts), 10 Losses, 0 Draw 
|- style="margin:0.5em auto; font-size:95%;"
|align=center style="border-style: none none solid solid; background: #e3e3e3"|Res.
|align=center style="border-style: none none solid solid; background: #e3e3e3"|Record
|align=center style="border-style: none none solid solid; background: #e3e3e3"|Opponent
|align=center style="border-style: none none solid solid; background: #e3e3e3"|Type
|align=center style="border-style: none none solid solid; background: #e3e3e3"|Rd., Time
|align=center style="border-style: none none solid solid; background: #e3e3e3"|Date
|align=center style="border-style: none none solid solid; background: #e3e3e3"|Location
|align=center style="border-style: none none solid solid; background: #e3e3e3"|Notes
|-
|Loss
|align=center| 29–10
|  Artur Szpilka
|align=center| TKO
|align=center| 3 (10)
|align=left| June 12, 2015
|align=left| UIC Pavilion, Chicago, Illinois
|align=left|
|-
|Loss
|align=center| 29–9
|  Andy Ruiz Jr.
|align=center| TKO
|align=center| 2 (10)
|align=left| May 17, 2014
|align=left| Selland Arena, Fresno, California
|align=left|
|-
|Loss
|align=center| 29–8
|  Steve Cunningham
|align=center| UD
|align=center| 8
|align=left| December 14, 2013
|align=left| Resorts International, Atlantic City, New Jersey
|align=left|
|-
|Loss
|align=center| 29–7
|  Bowie Tupou
|align=center| KO 
|align=center| 7 (10)
|align=left| May 14, 2011
|align=left|Home Depot Center, Carson, California
|align=left|
|-
| Loss
|align=center| 29–6
|  Cristobal Arreola
|align=center| UD
|align=center| 12 (12)
|align=left| August 13, 2010
|align=left|Citizens Business Bank Arena, Ontario, California 
|align=left| Vacant WBC FECOMBOX Heavyweight Title
|-
| Loss
|align=center| 29–5
|  Jason Gavern
|align=center| SD
|align=center| 10 (10)
|align=left| April 8, 2010
|align=left|Tachi Palace Hotel & Casino, Lemoore, California 
|align=left| WBC CABOFE Heavyweight Title
|-
| Win
|align=center| 29–4
|  Nicolai Firtha
|align=center| UD
|align=center| 10 (10)
|align=left| October 22, 2009
|align=left|Tachi Palace Hotel & Casino, Lemoore, California 
|align=left| WBC CABOFE Heavyweight Title
|-
| Win
|align=center| 28–4
|  Travis Walker
|align=center| KO
|align=center| 1 (12)
|align=left| July 16, 2009
|align=left|Tachi Palace Hotel & Casino, Lemoore, California 
|align=left| WBC CABOFE Heavyweight Title
|-
| Win
|align=center| 27–4
|  Jeffrey Brownfield
|align=center| TKO
|align=center| 1 (8)
|align=left| April 23, 2009
|align=left|Tachi Palace Hotel & Casino, Lemoore, California 
|align=left| 
|-
| Win
|align=center| 26–4
|  Eric Boose
|align=center| TKO
|align=center| 5 (10)
|align=left| February 6, 2009
|align=left|Tachi Palace Hotel & Casino, Lemoore, California 
|align=left| WBC CABOFE Heavyweight Title
|-
| Win
|align=center| 25–4
|  Teke Oruh
|align=center| UD
|align=center| 10 (10)
|align=left| November 29, 2008
|align=left|Citizens Business Bank Arena, Ontario, California 
|align=left| 
|-
| Win
|align=center| 24–4
|  Andrew Greeley
|align=center| UD
|align=center| 10 (10)
|align=left| August 21, 2008
|align=left|Tachi Palace Hotel & Casino, Lemoore, California 
|align=left| WBC CABOFE Heavyweight Title
|-

References

External links

American boxers of Mexican descent
Boxers from California
Heavyweight boxers
American male kickboxers
1977 births
Living people
American male boxers
People from Wasco, California